The 126th Air Surveillance, Early Warning and Guidance Brigade (abbr. ) is a joint tactical unit of Serbian Air Force and Air Defence, tasked with surveillance of the Serbian airspace and providing information on the current situation in airspace to all command levels in the Serbian Armed Forces.

History 
The brigade was formed after the break-up of Yugoslavia, on 12 October 1992, out of the three previous regiments. During the 1999 NATO bombing, the unit successfully conducted its tasks and was awarded the Order of the National Hero for its outstanding courage and achieved results.

Missions
The 126th ASEWG Brigade conducts the following tasks:

 continuous surveillance of airspace
 detection, monitoring and identification of targets in airspace
 collection, processing, presenting and distributing data about the situation in air space to all command levels
 radar security and guidance of fighter aircraft
 direction of air defence artillery-missile units to targets in airspace
 navigation support to aircraft in need 
 selection and arrangement of basic, reserve, false and follow-on radar positions 
 maintenance of radar systems

Structure 
The brigade consists of two ASWEG battalions, one support battalion and a command company:

 Command Company
 20th ASWEG Battalion (Batajnica Air Base)
 31st ASWEG Battalion (Lađevci Air Base)
 Battalion for Aero Technical Maintenance and Supply (Batajnica Air Base)

Equipment 
The main equipment of a brigade consists of the following radar-computing resources and systems:

 AN/TPS-70 medium-range three-dimensional surveillance radar
 S-605/654 medium-range two-dimensional surveillance radar
 S-613 altitude measuring radar
 АS-74 and AS-84 automated systems

In 2021, it was announced that three Thales radar systems (including 2 sets of Ground Master 400, 4 sets of Ground Master 200 and 16 sets of Ground Master 40) are purchased with expected introduction to the unit by the end of 2022.

Traditions

Anniversary
The anniversary of the unit is celebrated on June 18, in memory of the day in 1915 when the Serbian Supreme Command issued an order to form steady surveillance signal stations, in order to mark the direction of enemy airplanes flights.

Decorations
 Order of the National Hero (2000)

References 

Brigades of Serbia
Brigades of Yugoslav Air Force
Military units and formations established in 1992